Love Story (German: Liebesgeschichten) is a 1925 German silent film directed by Fritz Freisler and starring Olga Tschechowa, Hans Unterkircher and Claire Rommer.

The film's sets were designed by the art director Hermann Warm.

Cast
 Olga Tschechowa as Lilli, das Verhältnis
 Hans Unterkircher as Rudi Schönau, der "Unwiderstehliche" Hans
 Claire Rommer as Steffi, das "süße Mädel"
 Minna Jaida as Steffis Tante
 Karl Platen as Anton Reichelt, Buchhändler
 Richard Starnburg as Onkel Theobald
 Hans Thimig

References

Bibliography
 Hans-Michael Bock & Michael Töteberg. Das Ufa-Buch. Zweitausendeins, 1992.

External links

1925 films
Films of the Weimar Republic
Films directed by Fritz Freisler
German silent feature films
UFA GmbH films
German black-and-white films